Richard Hanson may refer to:

*Richard Hanson (Canadian politician) (1879–1948), Canadian politician
Richard Hanson (bishop) (1916–1988), bishop of Clogher in the Church of Ireland, 1970–1973
Richard Hanson (Australian politician) (1805–1876), British-Australian chief justice of South Australia
Richard H. Hanson (1931-2023), American politician
Richard Hanson (Missouri politician), American politician, secretary of state of Missouri in 1994

See also
Richard Hansen (disambiguation)
Richard Hanson Weightman (1816–1861), delegate to the United States Congress from the Territory of New Mexico